Peterhead Docks railway station was a goods railway station in Peterhead, Aberdeenshire.

References

Disused railway stations in Aberdeenshire
Transport in Peterhead
Buildings and structures in Peterhead
Disused railway goods stations in Great Britain